Isle of Capri may refer to:

 Capri, the Italian island
 Isle of Capri Casinos, an American gaming company
 "Isle of Capri" (song), a song written in 1934
 Isle of Capri, Queensland, a neighbourhood name within the Suburb of Surfers Paradise, on the Gold Coast, Queensland, Australia

See also
 Capri (disambiguation)